This is a list of clubs in the Hessenliga football league, including their final placings from 1945–46 to the current season. The league is the highest football league in the state of Hesse and is one of fourteen Oberligas in German football, the fifth tier of the German football league system. Until the introduction of the 3. Liga in 2008, it was the fourth tier of the league system, until the introduction of the Regionalligas in 1994 the third tier.

Overview
The league was formed in 1945, at the end of the Second World War, as Landesliga Hessen, a tier-two league with in two regional divisions. From 1947 on, it has always played in a single division format. In 1950, it changed its name to Amateurliga Hessen and became a tier-three league following the formation of the 2. Oberliga Süd above it. In 1978, the league changed its name to Amateur-Oberliga Hessen. In 1994, when the Regionalliga Süd was formed, the league changed its official name once more, now to Oberliga Hessen, and became a tier four league. In 2008 the league as renamed to Hessenliga and became a tier five league when the 3. Liga was formed. In 2012 the league above it, the Regionalliga Süd, was disbanded and replaced by the Regionalliga Südwest.

League timeline
The league went through the following timeline of name changes, format and position in the league system:

List of clubs
This is a complete list of clubs, as of the 2022–23 season, sorted by the last season a club played in the league:

Key

Notes
1 Eintracht Frankfurt II and FSV Frankfurt II withdrew from competitive football after the 2013–14 season.
2 Viktoria Aschaffenburg was relegated from the league after the 2009–10 season because it declared insolvency. The club moved from the Hessian league system to the Bavarian one at the end of the 2011–12 season.
3 TGM SV Jügesheim and FSV 1926 Fernwald withdrew from the league at the end of the 2013–14 season.
4 SV Erzhausen did not receive a licence for the 2006–07 season and was relegated.
5 Borussia Fulda did not receive a licence for the 2004–05 season and was relegated. The club withdrew its men's team from the league at the end of the 2017–18 season and integrated it into TSV Lehnerz to form SG Barockstadt Fulda-Lehnerz.
6 SC Neukirchen withdrew its team from the league at the end of the 2002–03 season.
7 SG Hoechst withdrew its team from the league at the end of the 2001–02 season.
8 VfB Gießen withdrew its team from the league at the end of the 2000–01 season. The club ceded its football section to Teutonia Watzenborn-Steinberg after the 2017–18 season, forming FC Gießen.
9 SGV Germania Horbach withdrew its team from the league at the end of the 1999–2000 season.
10 SG Egelsbach withdrew its team from the league at the end of the 1997–98 season.
11 SV Wiesbaden withdrew its team from the league at the end of the 1993–94 season and, again, after the 2015–16 season.
12 Kickers Offenbach II was relegated from the league at the end of the 1984–85 season because the senior team, Kickers Offenbach, was relegated from the 2. Bundesliga to the Oberliga.
13 FC Bayern Alzenau moved from the Bavarian league system to the Hessian one at the end of the 1991–92 season.
14 TSV Battenberg merged with SV Allendorf to form FC Ederbergland in 1997.
15 TuSpo Ziegenhain merged with Jahn Treysa to form 1. FC Schwalmstadt in 2004.
16 KSV Hessen Kassel went bankrupt in 1993 and re-formed as FC Hessen Kassel, taking the former's league place. FC Hessen Kassel went bankrupt in 1998 and re-formed as KSV Hessen Kassel, restarting in the lower amateur leagues.
17 1. FCA Darmstadt played as 1. FC Arheilgen until 1970.
18 VfB Marburg was part of VfL Marburg from 1937 to 1992.
19 SpVgg Bad Homburg withdrew during the 1998–99 season after 16 games, declaring insolvency, and folded soon after.
20 SV Wehen Wiesbaden II withdrew from competition at the end of the 2014–15 season.
21 1. FC Eschborn withdrew its team from the league to join the Gruppenliga at the end of the 2015–16 season.
22 Sportfreunde Seligenstadt withdrew its team at the end of the 2016–17 season.
23 TSV Lehnerz acquired the men's team of Borussia Fulda to become SG Barockstadt Fulda-Lehnerz in 2018.
24 SC Hessen Dreieich declined promotion for the 2017–18 season. Second-placed Eintracht Stadtallendorf was promoted instead. Dreieich withdrew its team from the league at the end of the 2021–22 season.
25 Teutonia Watzenborn-Steinberg merged with the football team of VfB Gießen to form FC Gießen in 2018.
26 FSC Lohfelden withdrew its team at the end of the 2018–19 season.

Clubs and their placings
The clubs and their league placings:

Landesliga Hessen 1945–50
The complete list of clubs and placings in the league while operating as the tier two Landesliga Hessen from 1945 to 1950. From 1945 to 1947 the league operated in two regional divisions:

Amateurliga Hessen 1950–63
The complete list of clubs and placings in the league while operating under the official name of Amateurliga Hessen as a tier-three league from 1950 to the introduction of the Bundesliga in 1963:

Amateurliga Hessen 1963–78
The complete list of clubs and placings in the league while operating as the tier three Amateurliga Hessen from 1963 to 1978:

Amateur-Oberliga Hessen 1978–94
The complete list of clubs and placings in the league while operating as the tier three Amateur-Oberliga Hessen from 1978 to 1994 and feeding the 2. Bundesliga:

Oberliga Hessen 1994–2008
The complete list of clubs and placings in the league while operating as the tier four Oberliga Hessen and feeding the Regionalliga Süd:

Hessenliga 2008–present
The complete list of clubs and placings in the league while operating as the tier five Hessenliga and feeding the Regionalliga Süd (2008–2012) and Regionalliga Südwest (2012–present):

Key

References

Sources 
 Deutschlands Fußball in Zahlen,  An annual publication with tables and results from the Bundesliga to Verbandsliga/Landesliga. DSFS.
 Kicker Almanach,  The yearbook on German football from Bundesliga to Oberliga, since 1937. Kicker Sports Magazine.
 Süddeutschlands Fußballgeschichte in Tabellenform 1897–1988  History of Southern German football in tables, by Ludolf Hyll
 Die Deutsche Liga-Chronik 1945–2005  History of German football from 1945 to 2005 in tables. DSFS. 2006.

External links 
 Hessischer Fussball Verband (Hesse FA) 

Football competitions in Hesse
Hesse